Elections were held in Cordillera Administrative Region for seats in the House of Representatives of the Philippines on May 9, 2016.

Summary

Abra
Ma. Jocelyn V. Bernos is the incumbent but she is not seeking for reelection. She is running for governor instead.

Apayao
Eleanor C. Bulut-Begtang is the incumbent and running unopposed.

Baguio
Nicasio M. Aliping Jr. is the incumbent.

Benguet
Ronald M. Cosalan is the incumbent.

Ifugao
Teodoro B. Baguilat, Jr. is the incumbent.

Kalinga
Incumbent Manuel S. Agyao is ineligible for reelection.

Mountain Province
Maximo B. Dalog is the incumbent and unopposed.

References

External links
Official COMELEC results 2016
COMELEC - Official website of the Philippine Commission on Elections (COMELEC)
NAMFREL - Official website of National Movement for Free Elections (NAMFREL)
PPCRV - Official website of the Parish Pastoral Council for Responsible Voting (PPCRV)

2016 Philippine general election
Lower house elections in the Cordillera Administrative Region